Élise Bussaglia (born 24 September 1985) is a French footballer who plays as a midfielder for French club Dijon of the Division 1 Feminine. She was a member of the France national team. Bussaglia is a former winner of the National Union of Professional Footballers (UNFP) Female Player of the Year having won the award after a successful 2010–11 season with Paris Saint-Germain.

Club career
Born in Sedan, Bussaglia was in middle school at Nassau in class with Benjamin Lemaire. She started to play soccer at US Balan with male team. During this period, she was supporting CS Sedan Ardennes.

Early career
Bussaglia began her career playing for Olympique Saint-Memmie playing at the club during her youth. She spent two years with the senior team before being selected to attend the CNFE Clairefontaine, the women's section of the Clairefontaine academy. After leaving the academy, she joined D1 Féminine club FCF Juvisy playing 14 matches and scoring two goals in her first season. In her second season with the club, she played in all 22 league matches scoring four goals helping Juvisy win the league title. She had another successful season before joining Montpellier. At Montpellier, Bussaglia became an established international player and helped Montpellier to two top table finishes, including helping the team win the 2008–09 Challenge de France and qualify for the newly created UEFA Women's Champions League in her final season.

Paris Saint-Germain
In 2009, Bussaglia signed with Paris Saint-Germain and, in the process, joined a club, which included international teammates Camille Abily, Sonia Bompastor, Bérangère Sapowicz, and Laure Boulleau. In her first season with Les Parisiens, despite the club having a respectable season, Bussaglia struggled appearing in 18 matches and scoring only two goals in the league. The midfielder compensated her uneventful performance in the league with a decent showing in the Challenge de France netting the fourth goal in Paris Saint-Germain's 5–0 win over her former club Montpellier in the competition's final match. The victory assured Bussaglia her third career Challenge de France title.

In the 2010–11 season, following the departures of Abily and Bompastor, Bussaglia was handed the reins to the attack and quickly blossomed scoring four goals in Paris Saint-Germain's first five league matches of the season. On 26 February 2011, she scored both club goals in a 2–1 win over Le Mans. Bussaglia ultimately finished the season appearing in all 22 matches and scoring a career-high ten goals. Despite failing to score a goal in the final six matches of the season, Bussaglia was still an important cog of the team as Paris Saint-Germain qualified for the 2011–12 edition of the UEFA Women's Champions League after finishing runner-up to champions Olympique Lyon. For her performances during the season, Bussaglia was named the UNFP Female Player of the Year. She was also named the Best Player of the 2010–11 Division 1 Féminine season by her peers.

International career
Bussaglia had previously starred with the women's under-19 team helping France win the 2003 UEFA Women's Under-19 Championship, held in Germany. On 13 November 2003, she earned her first cap with the women's national team in a match against Poland. As of today, she has 79 caps and has scored 18 goals for the national team. She retired in 2019.

Career statistics

Club

International

Scores and results list France's goal tally first, score column indicates score after each Bussaglia goal.

Honours
Juvisy
Division 1 Féminine: 2005–06
Coupe de France Féminine: 2004–05

Montpellier
Coupe de France Féminine: 2008–09

Paris Saint-Germain
Coupe de France Féminine: 2009–10

Lyon
Division 1 Féminine: 2012–13, 2013–14, 2014–15
Coupe de France Féminine: 2013, 2014, 2015

VfL Wolfsburg
Bundesliga: 2016-17
DFB-Pokal: 2015–16, 2016–17

Barcelona
 Copa de la Reina de Fútbol: 2018
 Copa Catalunya: 2017

France
UEFA Women's Under-19 Championship: 2003
Cyprus Cup: 2012, 2014
SheBelieves Cup: 2017

Individual
 UNFP Female Player of the Year: 2010–11
 Division 1 Féminine League Player of the Year: 2010–11

See also
 List of women's footballers with 100 or more caps

References

External links

 
 
  
 
 

1985 births
Living people
Expatriate women's footballers in Germany
French women's footballers
France women's international footballers
French expatriate sportspeople in Germany
CNFE Clairefontaine players
Paris Saint-Germain Féminine players
Montpellier HSC (women) players
Paris FC (women) players
Olympique Lyonnais Féminin players
VfL Wolfsburg (women) players
2011 FIFA Women's World Cup players
2015 FIFA Women's World Cup players
FIFA Century Club
Footballers at the 2012 Summer Olympics
Footballers at the 2016 Summer Olympics
Olympic footballers of France
People from Sedan, Ardennes
Women's association football midfielders
French sportspeople of Italian descent
French expatriate sportspeople in Spain
Expatriate women's footballers in Spain
Primera División (women) players
FC Barcelona Femení players
Division 1 Féminine players
Sportspeople from Ardennes (department)
2019 FIFA Women's World Cup players
Dijon FCO (women) players
Footballers from Grand Est
UEFA Women's Euro 2017 players
French expatriate women's footballers